

Guthheard (or Guðheard) was a medieval Bishop of Selsey.

Guthheard's only certain date is 845, when he witnessed a grant by Werenberht to Werheard.

Guthheard may also have witnessed a charter from 860 that was subsequently altered.

Guthheard died after the time period of 860 to 863, and sometime before 900.

Citations

References

Further reading

External links
 

Bishops of Selsey
9th-century English bishops